The Symphony No. 40 in F major, Hoboken I/40, is a symphony by Joseph Haydn.  Despite its number, Haydn had composed this symphony by 1763, long before the other symphonies numbered in the 30s and 40s in Hoboken's catalog. Chronologically, the symphony belongs with no. 13 and has stylistic similarities with Haydn's earliest symphonic output.

Movements
The work is in four movements and is scored for two oboes, bassoon, two horns,  and strings:

Allegro, 
Andante più tosto Allegretto in B major,  
Menuet e Trio, 
Allegro, 

The last movement is a fugue, as with the contemporary Symphony No. 13 and the later Symphony No. 70.

References

Symphony 040
Compositions in F major
1763 compositions